Live in Japan is the first live album by the hard rock band Harem Scarem. The recording was from a concert at the Club Citta in Japan. It includes two previously unreleased studio tracks.

The album was reissued in 1997 in a double CD package titled Live Ones together with the EP Live and Acoustic. The second CD also has a previously unreleased song, an acoustic version of "Change Comes Around", which was later released also on B-Side Collection (1998).

Track listing

Band members
Harry Hess – lead vocals, guitar, producer
Pete Lesperance – lead guitar, backing vocals, producer
Barry Donaghy – bass guitar, backing vocals
Darren Smith – drums, backing vocals

1996 live albums
Harem Scarem albums
Warner Music Group live albums